The white-plumed honeyeater (Ptilotula penicillata, formerly Lichenostomus penicillatus) is a small passerine bird endemic to Australia.  White-plumed honeyeaters are common around water and are often seen in backyards and suburbs with vegetation cover.

Taxonomy
First described by English naturalist John Gould in 1837, the specimen he examined came from "the interior of New South Wales". The species epithet penicillata derives from the Latin word penicillis meaning 'brush tip', referring to the white plume across the side of the neck. He placed the species in Meliphaga, where it would remain for almost 150 years. In 1975, Australian naturalist Richard Schodde split Meliphaga and placed the species in Lichenostomus. With the introduction of molecular studies, it was apparent that the white-plumed honeyeater belonged in a clade within Lichenostomus. This had first been suggested by Mathews in 1915, who placed it with the Yellow-tinted honeyeater in a genus he named Ptilotula; but this was rejected by the Royal Australasian Ornithologists Union. The Ptilotula clade was finally promoted to genus after new molecular evidence was published in 2011. The generic name Ptilotula derives from Ancient Greek  'feather' and the diminutive of  'ear'.

The species is probably of Miocene origin, with a fossil fragment found in Riversleigh, Queensland, appearing very similar to the white-plumed honeyeater leg-bone.

Description

The plumage does not differ between the sexes. The distinguishing characteristic is a conspicuous white plume across the neck from the throat to the edge of the nape. The top of head and neck are olive, with a yellow eye-ring surrounding a black-brown to olive-brown eye. Cheeks and ear coverts are yellow-olive, with the rear coverts tipped black, creating a short black stripe along the anterior edge of the neck plume. The chin and throat are dull yellowish-olive.

The upperparts are uniform grey-olive and the uppertail coverts have a yellowish tinge. Upperwing coverts are mostly brown with olive to yellow-olive tips or edges, creating a somewhat scalloped appearance. Remiges are dark brown with yellowish edges to secondaries, forming a yellow-olive panel when the wing is folded. Uppertail is olive-brown with yellow-olive outer edges. Underbody is mainly light brown-grey, with pale yellow streaks in the centre of the breast, pale yellow on the upper belly, flanks and undertail coverts, and cream on the lower belly. Underwing coverts are off-white with brown-grey remiges. Undertail is brownish grey.

The feet and legs are pinkish to purplish grey. During breeding season, the bill and gape are black; however, outside of breeding the bill obtains an orange-yellow or orange-brown base (only on the lower mandible in some individuals) with a yellow gape.

Four subspecies are recognised: Ptilotula penicillata penicillata, P. p. leilavalensis, P. p. carteri and P. p. calconi. P. p. leilavalensis is paler and yellower, P. p. carteri is strongly tinged yellow, and P. p. calconi yellower. These subspecies intergrade where ranges overlap. In all four races, males are slightly larger than females. P. p. penicillata is the largest, with males averaging  and females . Wing lengths are much larger in penicillatus, and bill lengths differ only slightly, with the bill of  P. p. carteri being somewhat longer than the other three subspecies.

Juveniles are similar to adults, but with duller colours on the top of head and neck, and brighter colours on the eye-ring and ear coverts. The plume is shorter and less distinct, often lacking the black border of the ear coverts. Underbody is slightly more brown. The bill is pink or yellowish with a brown tip in young individuals, changing to black with a yellow-orange or pinkish base; while the gape is yellow and noticeably puffy looking. In newly fledged birds, the feet and legs are a paler pinkish-brown and appear swollen compared to the adult.

Distribution and habitat
The species is widely distributed throughout south-eastern Australia (excluding Tasmania), up towards central Australia with patches occurring in central and western Queensland, Northern Territory and Western Australia. They are absent from desert areas but can persist in arid regions where trees and especially standing water are present.

The nominate race, P. p. penicillatus, occurs throughout south-eastern Australia to the Spencer Gulf in South Australia, and throughout the Murray-Darling basin. P. p. leilavalensis is found from Lake Eyre south to the Flinders Ranges in South Australia, east to the Barrier Ranges in western New South Wales, west to the edges of the Gibson and Great Sandy Deserts, and north to central-western Queensland. P. p. carteri occurs in the Pilbara region of WA from Geraldton to the Fortescue Ranges, and east to the Western Deserts; while P. p. calconi is known only from the southern Kimberley region.

The species has undergone range expansion in the last century. It was formerly linked closely to the distribution of river red gum (Eucalyptus camaldulensis) and a few other riverine species; but it has since expanded into coastal areas to become resident in Sydney and Newcastle, where they were previously uncommon or only seasonal visitors. Small local movements occur, perhaps in response to environmental conditions.

An oligotypic species, it is mainly found in open sclerophyll woodland, often near water sources, such as wetlands, swamps, creeks, and dams. It is found extensively in river red gum woodlands, but also riparian woodlands dominated by Eucalyptus, Melaleuca or Casuarina species. It may also be found in nearby river flats or open forest and woodland.

Diet
The white-plumed honeyeater's diet consists mainly of nectar, insects and their products (e.g., honeydew and lerp), manna, fruit, and very occasionally seeds. They may also peck at berries to feed on juice.

Where sufficient standing water occurs, P. penicillata can be observed drinking at least twice per day. In xeric habitats, additional moisture is obtained from food. A study in the Pilbara region of Western Australia found that white-plumed honeyeaters must eat around 100 berries to obtain 1mL of water. Needing 5-10mL per day, white-plumed honeyeaters were able to feed on 500–1000 berries in a five-hour period in order to obtain both caloric requirements and sufficient water intake.

Foraging behaviour
White-plumed honeyeaters mainly feed by gleaning leaf surfaces. The tongue contains brush-like filaments, consisting of about 60 bristles, which are capable of mopping up nectar. Arthropod prey is usually taken by gleaning, but some prey is taken on the wing.

In urban areas, they are typically canopy foragers but foraging heights can vary, depending on the influence of other resident species. For example, in the presence of aggressive competitors, such as fuscous honeyeaters, white-plumed honeyeaters avoid conflict by modifying their foraging behaviour. In one location, where ranges of the two species overlapped, white-plumed honeyeaters fed at lower heights in the overlap zone than they did in the riparian zone, where fuscous honeyeaters were absent.

Information on diet comes from scats, stomach contents, and foraging observations. Stomach contents are heavily biased toward strong tissues from plants and arthropods. In 1980, it was found that manna, honeydew, and lerp were extremely important food resources. Other research indicated that insects were only a small part of the diet, when they were previously thought to be major components. Insects are sometimes taken on the wing, but probably only provide a protein and mineral source, as a surplus of energy is available in nectar, lerp, and manna. The lower proportion of insects in the diet is a consequence of the fact that more energy is spent hawking prey than can be redeemed from the prey.

Social behaviour
This is a gregarious species, often found in groups of 12 or more individuals during the nonbreeding season. These larger groups then dissipate during breeding. P. penicillata is considered colonial, with observations of colonies throughout their range. There is some suggestion of cooperative breeding, but if occurring it is uncommon. Communal breeding is likely, with conspecifics grouping to attack predators near nests. However, individual territories within communities are maintained, with territorial song frequency increasing during the breeding season.

Experiments with captive populations indicate that hierarchies form, based on plumage colour, gape flange characters, and voice, but no data from wild populations exists. Observations of aggressive interactions between conspecifics and other species, such as the yellow-faced honeyeater (Caligavis chrysops), willie wagtail (Rhipidura leucophrys), red wattlebird (Anthochaera carunculata), and smaller species, such as pardalotes (Pardalotus spp.), mistletoebird (Dicaeum hirundinaceum), and other small honeyeaters have been made. There are some observations of attacks on fuscous honeyeaters, but the two species tend to avoid each other, where they occur sympatrically. In some regions, smaller birds are absent, due to the aggressive nature of white-plumed honeyeaters and other species of similar size, resulting in the exclusion of these poorer competitors.

Foraging groups may use a chip-chip contact call, or a song which is repeated by nearby individuals. Corroborees of up to 12 or more individuals, sitting together on a branch, have been observed, which engage in extensive calling, followed by rapid dispersal.

Breeding

Females are relatively more ready to breed from late winter through to summer; however, males maintain enlarged testes throughout the year. Breeding occurs throughout their range with records in all months, and clutches typically produced 2–3 times per year. Breeding events usually coincide with outbreaks of herbivorous insects.

Nests are small and cup-shaped,  in diameter and similar depth. These are skillfully woven from grasses and fine bark strips, bound with spider webs, and lined with animal hair, wool, and feathers. The female appears to be responsible for construction, but both sexes maintain and make repairs. Nests are usually located among the foliage in crowns of trees or shrubs, and only rarely seen in mistletoe. Sometimes nests are constructed in forks or on branches, and rarely in dead foliage. There is some evidence of site fidelity, and nest trees may be shared with active nests maintained by several other species, including wagtails, magpie-lark, woodswallows, and other honeyeater species.

Males undertake a song flight display, with a slight climbing and undulating flight above treetops while singing. At the song's completion, the male dives quickly into a nearby tree. This is performed throughout the day during breeding season, but less commonly in the early morning. Playback of this song does not induce territorial responses, suggesting the display is sexual in function. Other songs heard commonly after the breeding period begins may also have courtship functions.

The clutch is usually 2–3 eggs, varying from 1–4 overall. The second egg is typically laid within 24 hours of the first. Colour varies from white to pale buff or deep pink, minutely spotted with chestnut-red freckles towards the larger end. Eggs laid late in season tend to be lighter, and those from inland populations tend to be white with fewer markings.

Incubation is most likely solely by the female for a period of 13–15 days. Both parents feed the offspring during the nestling period of 11–15 days, and then for a further 2 weeks after fledging until independence. The nests are parasitized by pallid (Cacomantis pallidus) and fan-tailed cuckoos (Cacomantis flabelliformis) and Horsfield's (Chrysococcyx basalis) and shining bronze-cuckoos (Chrysococcyx lucidus).

Conservation status
The white-plumed honeyeater is considered by the International Union for Conservation of Nature (IUCN) to be of least concern for conservation.

Threats
Exotic vertebrate predators, such as cats and dogs, are a direct threat to white-plumed honeyeater populations. Loss of trees from watercourses will impact a population; however, they are able to adapt to suburban environments, especially where native gardens are present.

Climate effects
The white-plumed honeyeater body-size has been observed to change over recent decades, with individuals becoming smaller in extended drought, but showing an overall trend towards larger body-size since the 1960s. This is correlated with increasing temperatures in the regions surveyed, with body size increasing by 0.064% per year.

References

External links

 White plumed honeyeater sound recordings at Xeno Canto 
 Distribution information at Atlas of Living Australia

white-plumed honeyeater
white-plumed honeyeater
Endemic birds of Australia
Birds of Victoria (Australia)
Taxa named by John Gould